= HD 135438 =

Red giant star in the constellation Boötes

Observation data Epoch J2000 Equinox ICRS
- Constellation: Boötes
- Right ascension: 15^{h} 14^{m} 06.04269^{s}
- Declination: +31° 47′ 16.2454″
- Apparent magnitude (V): 5.97

Characteristics
- Evolutionary stage: red giant branch
- Spectral type: K5III or M0III
- B−V color index: 1.52

Astrometry
Radial velocity (R_{v})	−5.68±0.59 km/s
Proper motion (μ)	RA: +41.485 mas/yr Dec.: −28.200 mas/yr
Parallax (π)	5.0111±0.1361 mas
Distance	650 ± 20 ly (200 ± 5 pc)
Absolute magnitude (M_{V})	−0.33

Details
Mass	1.59±0.08 M_{☉}
Radius	50.15±2.59 R_{☉}
Luminosity	734+37 −34 L_{☉}
Surface gravity (log g)	1.17±0.14 cgs
Temperature	4,032±30 K
Metallicity [Fe/H]	−0.36±0.08 dex
Rotation	495? days
Rotational velocity (v sin i)	4.72 km/s

Other designations
- BD+32 2561, HD 135438, HIP 74561, HR 5674, SAO 64574

Database references
SIMBAD	data

HD 135438 is a red giant star in the northern constellation of Boötes. With an apparent magnitude of 6.0, it lies about 650 light-years away. HD 135438 has a magnitude 9.36 visual companion at an angular separation of 118.2″ along a position angle of 158° (as of 2012). Gaia Data Release 3 parallaxes indicate that the visual companion is an unrelated background star.

The star displays periodic radial velocity variations, likely caused by both intrinsic variability and an orbiting companion star, making this a probable single-lined spectroscopic binary. The companion star has at least half the mass of the Sun, and has an eccentric orbit with a period of about 8,500 days (23 years).
